Istvan Pely (born in 1974), is a Hungarian-American computer artist and game developer. He works at Bethesda Game Studios, specializing in art direction and 3D graphics.

His interest in video games began when his father brought home an Apple IIe; Pely enjoyed playing adventure games such as Dragon World and Wrath of Denethenor. He recalls that he "was really drawn to games as a storytelling medium, as well as an interesting challenge in the visual arts."

Pely began studying a computer science major at Loyola University Maryland. Having always been artistically inclined, he found computer science alone to be a bit too technical, while creating games was a "nice way to mesh technology and art." He instead completed a dual major at both computer and art departments. While still a student, he worked part-time as a multimedia consultant where he learned to work with many off-the-shelf packages such as 3D Studio, Photoshop, Premiere, and Director. Sacrificing his grades, with these tools he developed a Mac/PC adventure game called Majestic Part I: Alien Encounter, and managed to get it published before graduating. Since then he has developed two more science fiction games independently: Symbiocom and Zero Critical.

Pely eventually decided to focus solely on 3D art. His project Movkup is an avenue for exploring fantastical mechanical/industrial design. Pely has been with Bethesda Softworks since 1998. As the lead artist of Fallout 3 and Fallout 4, Pely was responsible for the overall visual style of the games, interface graphics, environments, and featured characters. Pely is a self-described “car nut” and having an interest in automotive design, he was also responsible for the design of the game's pre-war vehicles having the aerospace styling cues.

He married Hiu-Lai Chong, who worked as a character artist for Fallout 3.

Works

References

1974 births
Bethesda Softworks employees
Living people
Place of birth missing (living people)
Video game designers
Fallout (series) developers
American people of Hungarian descent